Mahogany L. Browne, (born Lesley Tims, 1976) is an American poet curator, writer, organizer and educator. As of July 2021, Browne is the first-ever poet-in-residence at New York City's Lincoln Center.

Biography
Mahogany L. Browne was born in Oakland, California and continued and raised in California before moving to Brooklyn, New York in 1999. She is known for her thirteen-year tenure as the Friday Night Slam curator and Poetry Program director at the Nuyorican Poets Café in Lower Manhattan. In 2019, Browne served as the Black Lives Matter (BLM) program coordinator at her alma mater, Pratt Institute, where she was also a visiting instructor.

Browne is currently the Executive Director at Bowery Poetry Club, founded by Bob Holman in 2003. Browne is also the Artistic Director at Urban Word NYC, Poetry Coordinator at St. Francis College and the author of several books (including children's books), stage plays, articles and audio recordings. The founder of Penmanship Books, Browne has received numerous awards and fellowships, among which is a fellowship from the Arts for Justice Fund (AJF). The Academy of American Poets has published several blog essays  of Browne's through their partnership with AJF.

Awards 
In 2019, Browne received a SWACC! Focus Fellowship, which is awarded to a spoken word author whose lifelong creative work has demonstrated a commitment to building community through collaborative models.

She was nominated for the NAACP Image Award for Outstanding Literary Work - Poetry.

She was nominated for the NAACP Image Award for Outstanding Literary Work - Poetry.

Publications

Young Adult 

 Chlorine Sky, Crown/Penguin Random, 2020
 Vinyl Moon, Crown/Penguin Random, 2021

Poetry collections 
Kissing Caskets, Yes Yes Books, 2017
Unlikely & Other Sorts, Penmanship Books, 2006
Destroy, Rebuild & Other Reconstructions of the Human Muscle, Penmanship Books, 2009
#Dear Twitter: Love Letters Hashed Out Online in 140 Characters or Less, Penmanship Books, 2010
Swag, Penmanship Books, 2010
smudge, Button Poetry, 2015
REDBone, Willow Books, 2015
 Black Girl Magic: A Poem, Roaring Brook Press, 2018
 Woke Baby, Roaring Brook Press, 2018

Essays
 "Dismantling Rage: On Audre Lorde’s Sister Outsider"

Poems
 "Ego-Tripp(ed)," The Academy of American Poets, 2015
"Litany," The Academy of American Poets, 2019
 "Inevitable," The Academy of American Poets, 2019
 "On St. John’s and Franklin Avenue," The Academy of American Poets, 2019
 "The 19th Amendment & My Mama", march 21 2020

Anthologies
 Editor, His Rib: Stories, Poems & Essays by Her, Penmanship Books, 2007
Editor and contributor, The BreakBeat Poets Volume 2: Black Girl Magic, Haymarket Books, 2018
Contributor, Well-Read Black Girl: Finding Our Stories, Discovering Ourselves by Glory Edim, Penguin Random House, 2018
Lead author (with Elizabeth Acevedo and Olivia Gatwood), Woke: A Young Poet's Call to Justice, Roaring Brook Press, 2020 
Contributor, Four Hundred Souls: A Community History of African America by Ibram X. Kendi and Keisha N. Blain, Penguin Random House, 2020 
Contributor, African American Poetry: 250 Years of Struggle & Song by Kevin Young, Penguin Random House, 2020

References

External links 
 

1976 births
Living people
American women poets
Pratt Institute alumni
21st-century American poets
Poets from California
African-American poets
American women children's writers
American children's writers
African-American children's writers
American women dramatists and playwrights
Writers from Brooklyn
African-American dramatists and playwrights
Poets from New York (state)
21st-century American women writers
21st-century African-American women writers
21st-century African-American writers
20th-century African-American people
20th-century African-American women